Bishop Sutton is a village on the northern slopes of the Mendip Hills, within the affluent Chew Valley in Somerset. It lies east of Chew Valley Lake and north east of the Mendip Hills, approximately ten miles south of Bristol on the A368, Weston-super-Mare to Bath road between West Harptree and Chelwood. Bishop Sutton and the neighbouring village of Stowey form the civil parish of Stowey Sutton.

The village has a large village hall, a public house (The Red Lion), an organic culinary school and bed and breakfast (Meadow View), a small supermarket, several shops including a Post Office within the village store, a tennis club and a caravan park. Next to the village hall are sports pitches where Bishop Sutton F.C. play. The lake is a popular place for children, adults and the elderly alike with beautiful views and entertainment such as fishing and sailing. There is a museum and tea shop on one side of the lake and a restaurant on the other.

The main industry in the village was a coal mine owned by J. Lovell & Sons from 1835 to 1929, which was part of the Somerset coalfield. There was also a large flour mill, part of which was converted into flats.

History

Coal mining 

Much of the exploratory survey work which identified the geology of the area was carried out by William Smith, who became known as the "Father of English Geology", building on earlier work in the same area by John Strachey, who lived at Sutton Court.

The Pensford coal basin lies in the northern area of the Somerset coalfield around Bishop Sutton, Pensford, Stanton Drew, Farmborough and Hunstrete.

The date for the first pits around Bishop Sutton are uncertain but there was at least one before 1719. By 1824 a collection of four bell pits were identified in field tithe No 1409, and four shaft pits in field tithe No 1428, but they were no longer working.

The Old Pit, which was also known as Sutton Top Pit or Upper Sutton Pit, was dug before 1799 and owned by Lieutenant Henry Fisher, who sold it in 1821 to Robert Blinman Dowling and several seams of coal were identified and exploited. After Dowling's death the Old Pit was sold to Mr. T.T. Hawkes in 1852, but he defaulted on the payments and it was sold in 1853 to William Rees-Mogg (an ancestor of William Rees-Mogg) and his associates. The New Pit had two shafts of  diameter, one for winding and one for pumping. In 1896 it was owned by F. Spencer, New Rock Colliery, and in 1908 by Jesse Lovell and Sons. The pit finally closed in 1929.

Government and politics 
Bishop Sutton, along with Stowey, makes up the Stowey Sutton Parish council, which has some responsibility for local issues and is part of the Chew Valley South Ward, including setting an annual precept (local rate) to cover the council's operating costs and producing annual accounts for public scrutiny. The parish council evaluates local planning applications and works with the local police, district council officers, and neighbourhood watch groups on matters of crime, security, and traffic. The parish council's role also includes initiating projects for the maintenance and repair of parish facilities, such as the village hall or community centre, playing fields and playgrounds, as well as consulting with the district council on the maintenance, repair, and improvement of highways, drainage, footpaths, public transport, and street cleaning. Conservation matters (including trees and listed buildings) and environmental issues are also of interest to the council.

The parish falls within the unitary authority of Bath and North East Somerset which was created in 1996, as established by the Local Government Act 1992. It provides a single tier of local government with responsibility for almost all local government functions within its area including local planning and building control, local roads, council housing, environmental health, markets and fairs, refuse collection, recycling, cemeteries, crematoria, leisure services, parks, and tourism. It is also responsible for education, social services, libraries, main roads, public transport, trading standards, waste disposal and strategic planning, although fire, police and ambulance services are provided jointly with other authorities through the Avon Fire and Rescue Service, Avon and Somerset Constabulary and the Great Western Ambulance Service.

Bath and North East Somerset's area covers part of the ceremonial county of Somerset but it is administered independently of the non-metropolitan county. Its administrative headquarters is in Bath. Between 1 April 1974 and 1 April 1996, it was the Wansdyke District and the City of Bath of the county of Avon. Before 1974 that the parish was part of the Clutton Rural District.

The parish falls within the 'Chew Valley South' electoral division. Bishop Sutton is the most populous area of the ward but this stretches north and west to Nempnett Thrubwell. The total population of the ward as at the 2011 census was 2,377.

The parish is represented in the House of Commons of the Parliament of the United Kingdom as part of North East Somerset. It elects one member of parliament (MP) by the first past the post system of election. It was also part of the South West England constituency of the European Parliament prior to Britain leaving the European Union in January 2020, which elected seven MEPs using the d'Hondt method of party-list proportional representation.

Geography

Folly Farm 

Folly Farm is a traditionally managed visitable farm and nature reserve run by the Avon Wildlife Trust.
The farm house is 17th century and the surrounding land includes neutral grassland, flowery meadows and woodlands with splendid views. Much of Folly Farm is designated as a biological Site of Special Scientific Interest. The SSSI comprises two adjacent areas, the meadows (19.36 hectares) and Dowlings Wood (9 hectares). The site is situated on a curved ridge of land on neutral soils derived from the underlying Keuper Marl. The soil is of the Icknield Association with dark brown, moist but moderately well-drained clay. It attracts a wide range of birds. The pasture is of a kind now rare in the area. A number of scarce species of fly are listed from the site.

The site was purchased from the Strachey family who were lords of the manor of the nearby Sutton Court in 1987.

Burledge Hill 

Burledge Hill is on the southern edge of the village of Bishop Sutton. The site comprises a mixture of flower rich grassland, scrub and mature hedgerows. Three fields are designated as Burledge Sidelands and Meadows a Site of Nature Conservation Interest (SNCI), and, since November 2005, as a Site of Special Scientific Interest (SSSI) covering 48.7 ha.

Burledge hillfort is a univallate Iron Age hillfort. The site was investigated three times: in 1955 by the University of Bristol Spelaeological Society and in 1959 and 1966 by field investigation. In 1955, the excavating archaeologists found evidence of post or stake holes, ditches, pits, and gullies inside the fort. They also found artifacts like a part of an iron fibula, animal bones, and pottery. One find which evidenced that metalworking was done at this site was the discovery of iron slag.

Demographics 
According to the 2001 census, the Chew Valley South Ward (which includes Bishop Sutton and Stowey) had 1,222 residents, living in 476 households, with an average age of 40.3 years. Of these, 76% of residents described their health as 'good', 25% of 16- to 74-year-olds had no qualifications; and the area had an unemployment rate of 1.9% of all economically active people aged 16–74. In the Index of Multiple Deprivation 2004, it was ranked at 28,854 out of 32,482 wards in England, where 1 was the most deprived LSOA and 32,482 the least deprived.

Church 

The Church of the Holy Trinity in Wick Road is the Anglican parish church. The building dates from 1848 and is a Grade II listed building. During 2006 a grant of £64,000 was received from English Heritage to replace the roof of the church.

The village also possesses a Methodist Chapel that dates in part from the 1780s and it is thought that John Wesley the founder of Methodism may have preached there.

The Elms 
The Elms on Sutton Hill Road is a detached house dating from the early 18th century which has Grade II listed building status.

Education 
The village school has 115 pupils aged 4–11 years on the roll. It dates back to 1842 and was originally a school for pupils up to the age of 14. At one time it was a Church school but no longer has this status. The building today consists of the original Victorian school and three detached classrooms.

After the age of 11, most pupils attend Chew Valley School

Sport and leisure 

Bishop Sutton A.F.C. were officially established in 1977, although it is actually a reformed version of a club that dated from the early 1900s. Bishop Sutton joined the Western Football League in 1991 after playing in the Somerset County League and prior to that the Bristol and Avon League.  A title in the 1997–98 season in Division One earned the club a promotion to the Premier Division, where they have played ever since. They reached the 3rd round of the FA Vase in the 1995–96 season, losing to AFC Lymington.

There is also a tennis club in the village.

In 2011, residents of Bishop Sutton and surrounding villages banded together to form a new charity, the Chew Valley Youth Trust, to combat the declining provision in leisure and recreational activities for young people in the region.  In response to the closure of local Youth Clubs and declining state support for local transport, the charity combats issues of rural isolation and provides young residents with recreational activities.

Notable residents 
 Dr Liam Fox, a Conservative MP and former member of the cabinet, used to live in Bishop Sutton but sold his house in 2005/6.
 The former professional footballer Andy Williams was brought up in Bishop Sutton

References

Bibliography

Further reading
Dews, Karen & Henon, Andrew, eds. (2008) Water Memories Making History; with young people of Bishop Sutton Youth Centre. Nesa Publications

External links 

 Map of Bishop Sutton circa 1900

Mendip Hills
Somerset coalfield
Villages in Bath and North East Somerset